Isthmohyla pictipes is a species of frog in the family Hylidae.
It is found in Costa Rica and possibly Panama.
Its natural habitats are subtropical or tropical moist montane forests and rivers.
It is threatened by habitat loss.

References

Isthmohyla
Amphibians described in 1875
Taxonomy articles created by Polbot